The 1972 South Carolina Gamecocks football team represented the University of South Carolina as an independent in the 1972 NCAA University Division football season. Led by seventh-year head coach Paul Dietzel, the Gamecocks compiled a record of 4–7. The team played home games at Williams–Brice Stadium in Columbia, South Carolina.

Schedule

References

South Carolina
South Carolina Gamecocks football seasons
South Carolina Gamecocks football